A.1. Sauce (formerly A.1. Steak Sauce and sometimes stylized as A1 Sauce in certain markets) is a brand of brown sauce produced by Brand & co, a subsidiary of Premier Foods in the United Kingdom (as "Brand's A.1. Sauce") and in North America by Kraft Heinz. Sold from 1861 as a condiment for meat or game dishes in the United Kingdom, the makers introduced the product to Canada, and later to the U.S. where it was marketed as a steak sauce. A.1. sauce is still produced in England and exported to Asia. In May 2014, Kraft Foods announced it was dropping the word "steak" from the A.1. name, reverting to A.1. Sauce, to "reflect modern dining habits". Although the sauce is widely available in the U.S. and Canada, by 2023 it is sold only by Costco and specialist importers in the UK.

History and ownership 
In 1824 Henderson William Brand, a chef to King George IV of the United Kingdom, created the original sauce on which A.1. is based. A popular myth has it that the king declared it "A.1." and the name was born. The term "A.1." originated as a ship insurance term in the UK to describe a "first rate" ship by Lloyd's of London. It went into commercial production under the Brand & Co. label in 1831, marketed as a condiment for "fish, meat and fowl", and continued production under this label after bankruptcy forced ownership of Brand & Co. to be transferred to W. H. Withall in 1850. It was renamed A.1. in 1873, after a trademark dispute between creator Henderson William Brand and Dence & Mason, who had since purchased Brand & Co. from Withall. It continued to be produced by Brand & Co. until the late 1970s at the firm's factory in Vauxhall, London until it fell out of favour within the UK domestic market.

A.1. was officially registered as a trademark in the US in 1895, and imported and distributed in the United States by G. F. Heublein & Brothers in 1906. Beginning in the early 1960s, it was marketed in the US as "A.1. Steak Sauce".

R. J. Reynolds, which merged with Nabisco in 1985 to form RJR Nabisco, acquired Heublein in 1982. In 1999, Kraft Foods acquired Nabisco, including the licence for the A.1. brand in North America.

A.1. brand in the UK was owned by Ranks Hovis McDougall for a time and currently owned by Premier Foods.

In the USA during the 1980s, two new flavours of A.1. were introduced, representing the first expansion of the trademark in North America. These varieties were soon discontinued. In 2000, an A.1. line of marinades was launched.

Rock musician and singer Meat Loaf appeared in a TV commercial for the product, to promote its new slogan: "A.1.—Makes beef sing". In the commercial, the slogan is "Makes Meat Loaf sing", and he sings a very short excerpt from his hit song "I'd Do Anything for Love (But I Won't Do That)".

Ingredients
A.1. Sauce in the US includes tomato purée, raisin paste, spirit vinegar, corn syrup, salt, crushed orange purée, dried garlic and onions, spice, celery seed, caramel color, potassium sorbate, and xanthan gum. The 'Original' A1 recipe exported to the USA dramatically differs from the versions sold in the UK and in Canada. A.1. Sauce in Canada includes tomato purée, marmalade, raisins, onions, garlic, malt vinegar, sugar, salt, tragacanth, spices and flavourings.

Legal action 
A.1. in the United States was the subject of a trademark dispute between then-owners RJR Nabisco and Arnie Kaye of Westport, Connecticut, whose International Deli was producing and selling its own recipe condiment under the name "A.2. Sauce". In 1991, the United States District Court for Connecticut found in favour of Nabisco.

Advertising

Some slogans for A.1. include:
 "The DASH that Makes The DISH" (1940s)
 "Don't cover it. Discover it, with A.1." (1980s)
 "Great Steak! Great fun! A.1.!" (1981)
 "A.1. makes hamburgers taste like steakburgers." (early 1980s)
 "A.1.—How Steak is Done." (1990s)
 "A.1.—Yeah, it's that important." (early-mid-2000s)
 "A.1.—Makes Meat Loaf sing." (2009)
 "A.1.—For Almost Everything. Almost." (2014)
 "A.1.—Makes beef sing." (current)

See also

 Brown sauce
 List of brand name condiments

References

External links

 

1831 introductions
Brand name condiments
British cuisine
Brown sauces
Kraft Foods brands
Steak sauces
Premier Foods brands